Charles Blakely may refer to:

 Charles Adams Blakely (1879–1950), United States Navy officer
 Charles School Blakely (1880–1975), American army general